Connecticut Transit New Haven is the second largest division of Connecticut Transit, providing service on 24 routes in 19 towns within the Greater New Haven and Lower Naugatuck River Valley areas, with connections to other CT Transit routes in Waterbury and Meriden, as well as connections to systems in Milford and Bridgeport at the Connecticut Post Mall.

Since 1979, the Hartford, New Haven, and Stamford divisions of CT Transit have been operated by First Transit. Service is operated seven days a week on 24 routes.

Routes

Regular routes
All routes below originate from the New Haven Green. Through service is provided between routes with the same letter. In October 2017, CTtransit New Haven transitioned their routes from letters to numbers, and are now identified as routes 201-299.

Operation 

In downtown New Haven, Connecticut pedestrians board public buses on all sides of the green -the "Central Park" of New Haven.  New Haven's buses are late to stops over fifty percent of the time.

State Public Transit Administrator Dennis Solensky suggested this structure of routing, which he calls hub and spoke, funneling all people downtown . The use of the spoke-hub distribution paradigm results in buses sitting in traffic in the heart of the city, which may delay scheduled stops. 

Bus service guidelines in Connecticut suggest there be no more than four stops per mile on any given route. However, CT Transit's General Transit Feed Specification shows that only two of the twenty-five routes have on average less than four stops per mile with the highest being eleven. Bus ridership in New Haven has fallen drastically hurting an already struggling transportation budget. Economic returns from bus routes have ranged from sixty-four percent to two percent of the cost to maintain.

There are no plans to amend this issue even after the addition of GPS monitoring on all buses revealed how bad the situation truly is. Fifty five percent of stops are reached exceeding five minutes past the scheduled time.

See also
Connecticut Transit Hartford
Connecticut Transit New Britain and Bristol
Connecticut Transit Stamford
Northeast Transportation Company

All of the above provide CT Transit route service.

References

External links
 Official website for CT Transit

Bus transportation in Connecticut
Surface transportation in Greater New York
Transportation in New Haven, Connecticut
Transportation in New Haven County, Connecticut
Train-related introductions in 1976